The Arthurs Seat Eagle is a gondola lift operated from the base station in Dromana to the summit of Arthurs Seat, in the Mornington Peninsula, in Victoria, Australia. Construction commenced in October 2015 and was completed on 5 September 2016 at a cost of $20 million. The lift officially opened on 3 December 2016. It replaced the Arthurs Seat Chairlift which was closed in 2006 after a number of safety issues. Arthurs Seat Eagle briefly went into administration in March 2020 when Covid caused it to shut down, although it is now operational again.

References

External links

Mornington Peninsula
Tourist attractions in Victoria (Australia)